Alicia Mateus (born 9 May 2004) is a Mozambican swimmer. She competed in the women's 50 metre freestyle at the 2020 Summer Olympics.

References

External links

2004 births
Living people
Mozambican female freestyle swimmers
Olympic swimmers of Mozambique
Swimmers at the 2020 Summer Olympics
Place of birth missing (living people)
Swimmers at the 2022 Commonwealth Games
Commonwealth Games competitors for Mozambique
21st-century Mozambican women